The Thomas Eakins Head of the Schuylkill Regatta (also known as the HOSR or the HOS) is a rowing race held annually during the last weekend in October on the Schuylkill River in Philadelphia, Pennsylvania. The HOSR is the final race in the Fall Fury series, which includes the Head of the Ohio and the Head of the Connecticut. Along with the Head of the Charles and the Head of the Connecticut, the HOSR is considered one of the three “fall classics.” The HOSR is one of the marquee races in the Philadelphia Classic Regatta Series, which also includes the Stotesbury Cup Regatta, the Philadelphia Scholastic Rowing Championship, the Schuylkill Navy Regatta, and the Independence Day Regatta.

History

The HOSR was first held in 1874. The regatta, as it exists now, was founded in 1971 by members of the University Barge Club, Joseph N. “J” Pattison IV and Olympic Rower, Lyman S.A. Perry.

Until recently, the event was the largest one-day rowing competition in the world. The HOSR became a two-day event in 2008. It is the largest regatta in Philadelphia. As of 2003, the HOSR was America's second largest regatta.

Format and course
The HOSR is a head race, which is a time-trial competition where boats race in close succession from a rolling start.  The rower or crew completing the course in the shortest time in their age, ability and boat-class category is deemed the winner.

The course stretches  from the start to the finish at Boathouse Row and contains four bridges in total, which appear in this order from the start:

The Columbia Railroad Bridge, is the most difficult part of the course because coxswains must make a sharp turn of nearly ninety degrees.

There is a dangerous waterfall less than 300 meters from the finish line across from Boathouse Row. The 13-foot Fairmount Water Works Dam stretches 400 meters across the Schuylkill.

The dam is difficult for coxswains to see because it is so wide. A rowing shell caught broadside beyond the safety cable would easily be swept over the falls.

Competitors

The regatta draws competitors from across the United States and internationally. Competing teams regularly hail from countries including:

The HOSR is a fall championship regatta for many regional schools. The regatta sets itself apart with an expanded schedule of small boats and a field of quads "deep enough to do justice to Philadelphia’s rich sculling heritage." The Head of the Schuylkill is a self-described "inclusive regatta." However, it also attracts top world-class athletes. Recent competitors include:
 Victoria Opitz, world record W8+
 Kerry Simmonds, world record W8+
 Esther Lofgren, Olympic gold medalist W8+

Points trophies
Since 2010, the HOSR has awarded points trophies in high school, college, open and masters categories for overall all team points and by gender. Only six programs have won the overall points trophy:

Overall
College

 Drexel University (2010–2014)
 Villanova University (2014) (tied with Drexel)
Open

 Vesper Boat Club (2011–2014)
 Penn AC (2010)
Masters

 Vesper Boat Club (2010–2013)
High School

 Saugatuck Rowing Association (2012–2013)
 Connecticut Boat Club (2010–2011)

By gender

Philadelphia Gold Cup Challenge

The Philadelphia Challenge Cup, known as "The Gold Cup", began during the heyday of Philadelphia rowing and pitted the best amateur male single scullers in the world against each other in a sprint race on the famed Schuylkill River. In 1920, J. Elliot Newlin, the Commodore of the Schuylkill Navy and head of the Philadelphia Challenge Cup Committee, presented the Gold Cup to its first winner, John B. Kelly Sr. from Vesper Boat Club.

The Gold Cup was originally created by a popular subscription of more than $2,500, and was to be to rowing what the Davis Cup is to tennis. Its founding followed Mr. Kelly's winning the 1920 Olympics single sculls and the Henley Royal Regatta barring him from competing in the Diamond Challenge Sculls on the grounds he had been a brick layer, which meant he "wasn't a gentleman" and was therefore ineligible to compete as an amateur.

The Gold Cup mysteriously disappeared, ending the competition in the 1960s, only to reemerge in 2011 after a 50-year hiatus, with the expansion of the competition to women. The race is held on a 750-meter course at the Head of the Schuylkill Regatta.

References

External links
 
 

Schuylkill River
Rowing competitions in the United States
Recurring sporting events established in 1971
Sports in Philadelphia
Culture of Philadelphia
Head races